USS Kidd (DDG-100) is an  in the United States Navy. She is the third Navy ship named after Rear Admiral Isaac C. Kidd, who was on board  during the attack on Pearl Harbor, and was the first American flag officer to die in World War II. The ship is part of Destroyer Squadron 1 of Carrier Strike Group 1 which is currently headed by the  nuclear-powered aircraft carrier USS Carl Vinson (CVN-70).

Construction and career

Kidd was christened by Admiral Kidd's granddaughters, Regina Kidd Wolbarsht and Mary Kidd Plumer on 22 January 2005, at Ingalls Shipbuilding in Pascagoula, Mississippi. Commander Richard E. Thomas of Westwood, New Jersey, served as her first commanding officer until February 2008. Commander Charles P. Good of Huntington Beach, California, took Kidd on her maiden deployment.

While in the midst of final outfitting, the ship was holed and partially flooded at the shipyard docks during Hurricane Katrina on the Mississippi Gulf Coast, requiring a return to dry dock for repairs, which included cutting out a turbine, delaying her commissioning and deployment with the Navy. She was commissioned at Galveston, Texas on 9 June 2007. Kidd is currently homeported in Everett, Washington.

On 5 January 2012, Kidd rescued the 13-member crew of the Iranian-flagged fishing vessel Al Molai from Somali pirates who had been holding them hostage for over 40 days, capturing fifteen pirates in the process with no casualties.

Search for Malaysia Airlines MH 370

On 10 March 2014 the ship joined the search for Malaysia Airlines Flight 370 two days after it went missing over the South China Sea. Kidd was the second Navy ship to be deployed in the search. It joined , and more than 40 other ships and 32 aircraft from Malaysia, Australia, China, India, Thailand, Indonesia, Singapore, Taiwan, Vietnam, New Zealand, and the Philippines taking part in the search and rescue. On 14 March it was announced that Kidd would be relocated to the Indian Ocean in search of the plane, since new evidence points to the possibility of the plane being there.

2020 COVID-19 pandemic

On 24 April 2020, the United States Navy reported that a sailor assigned to Kidd had tested positive for the virus after being medically evacuated the previous day from operations at sea.  After the sailor's test returned positive, the Navy sent a medical team to the ship to conduct contact tracing and test sailors for the virus on board.  By the morning of 24 April, 17 additional sailors tested positive, with additional cases expected as testing continued.

The initial patient was stable and recovering at a medical facility in San Antonio, Texas.  It was planned for Kidd to return to port so that it could be disinfected. This was the second instance of the coronavirus being found aboard an American naval ship that had been deployed.

References

External links

 Official ship's site
 
 MaritimeQuest USS Kidd (DDG-100) pages
 IMDB
 The Kidd Incident

 

Arleigh Burke-class destroyers
Ships built in Pascagoula, Mississippi
2005 ships
Naval ships involved in the COVID-19 pandemic